Ken or Gen (majuscule: Կ; minuscule: կ; Armenian: կեն) is the fifteenth letter of the Armenian alphabet, representing the voiceless velar plosive in Eastern Armenian and the voiced velar plosive in Western Armenian. It is typically romanized with the letter K. It was part of the alphabet created by Mesrop Mashtots in the 5th century CE. In the Armenian numeral system, it has a value of 60.

Character codes

See also
 Tsa, the letter preceding Ken in the Armenian alphabet
 Armenian alphabet

References

External links
 Դ on Wiktionary
 դ on Wiktionary

Armenian letters
Armenian alphabet
Armenian language